In geometry, a lemon is a geometric shape, constructed as the surface of revolution of a circular arc of angle less than half of a full circle, rotated about an axis passing through the endpoints of the lens (or arc). The surface of revolution of the complementary arc of the same circle, through the same axis, is called an apple. 

The apple and lemon together make up a self-crossing torus, the surface of revolution of the entire circle, with the apple as the outer shell of the torus and the lemon as its inner shell. The lemon forms the boundary of a convex set, while its surrounding apple is non-convex.

The ball in North American football has a shape resembling a geometric lemon. However, although used with a related meaning in geometry, the term "football" is more commonly used to refer to a surface of revolution whose Gaussian curvature is positive and constant, formed from a more complicated curve than a circular arc. Alternatively, a football may refer to a more abstract orbifold, a surface modeled locally on a sphere except at two points.

See also
Sears–Haack body
List of shapes

References

External links

Football shaped (spindle type) surface of positive constant curvature in the University of Groningen model collection

Geometric shapes